Papilio zenobia, the Zenobia swallowtail or Volta swallowtail, is a species of swallowtail butterfly from the genus Papilio that is found in Guinea, Sierra Leone, Liberia, Ivory Coast, Ghana, Nigeria, Cameroon, Equatorial Guinea, the Republic of the Congo and Uganda. It was first described by Johan Christian Fabricius in 1775. The habitat consists of wetter forest in good to reasonable condition.

The larvae feed on Piper species, including Piper umbellatum.

Taxonomy

It is a member of the zenobia species group. In the zenobia group the basic upperside wing pattern is black with white or yellowish bands and spots. The underside is brown and basally there is a red area marked with black stripes and spots. In the discal area there is a yellowish band with black stripes and veins. Females resemble butterflies of the genus Amauris. Both sexes lack tails.

The clade members are:
Papilio cyproeofila Butler, 1868
Papilio fernandus Fruhstorfer, 1903
Papilio filaprae Suffert, 1904
Papilio gallienus Distant, 1879
Papilio mechowi Dewitz, 1881
Papilio mechowianus Dewitz, 1885
Papilio nobicea Suffert, 1904
Papilio zenobia Fabricius, 1775

Diagnosis
It is very similar to Papilio cyproeofila but lacking white marginal spots on the hindwings. It is also close to Papilio nobicea but differs slightly in its cream bands, which are also of a different shape  "Tail-less black with a very broad white median band; in the male the median band initially invades the discoidal cell of the forewing." (Robert Herbert Carcasson, 1960)

References

Carcasson, R. H. (1960). "The Swallowtail Butterflies of East Africa (Lepidoptera, Papilionidae)". Journal of the East Africa Natural History Society. Key to East Africa members of the species group, diagnostic and other notes and figures. (Permission to host granted by The East Africa Natural History Society.)

External links
swallowtails.net Images
Global Butterfly Information System Images (as subgenus Druryia)
Butterfly Corner Images from Naturhistorisches Museum Wien
"Papilio zenobia Fabricius, 1775". Insecta.pro. With images.

zenobia
Butterflies described in 1775
Taxa named by Johan Christian Fabricius